The Littlest Hobo is a Canadian television series based upon a 1958 American film of the same name directed by Charles R. Rondeau. The series first aired from 1963 to 1965 in syndication, and was revived for a popular second run on CTV, spanning six seasons, from October 11, 1979 to March 7, 1985. It starred an ownerless intelligent German Shepherd dog, the titular Hobo, who befriends and helps humans (portrayed by well-known Canadian and Hollywood actors in celebrity guest appearances).

Series overview

Episodes

Season 1 (1979–80)

Season 2 (1980-81)

Season 3 (1981-82)

Season 4 (1982-83)

Season 5 (1983-84)

Season 6 (1984-85)

References

Lists of Canadian television series episodes